Batrachorhina approximata also known as lamiines or flat-faced longhorned beetle,  is a species of beetle in the family Cerambycidae. It was described by Stephan von Breuning in 1940. It is known from Kenya.

References

Batrachorhina
Beetles described in 1940